During the 1998–99 English football season, Ipswich Town competed in the Football League First Division.

Season summary
In the 1998–99 season, Ipswich fans felt it would be third time lucky in the play-offs for the Tractor Boys. However the team once again lost on away goals to Bolton Wanderers. Ipswich had been second at the beginning of April but defeat to Bolton saw Bradford City overtake them and two more defeats in their last four games, including a shock home defeat to relegation-threatened Crewe Alexandra, saw Ipswich finish third.

First-team squad

Left club during season

Reserve squad

Competitions

Football League First Division

League table

Legend

Ipswich Town's score comes first

Matches

First Division play-offs

FA Cup

League Cup

Transfers

Transfers in

Loans in

Transfers out

Loans out

Awards

Player awards

PFA First Division Team of the Year

References

Ipswich Town F.C. seasons
Ipswich Town